Paradise (also known as Lamb of God) is a 2013 American comedy-drama film written and directed by Diablo Cody, in her directorial debut. It stars Julianne Hough, Russell Brand, Octavia Spencer, Holly Hunter, Iliza Shlesinger and Kathleen Rose Perkins and was released October 18, 2013.

The title is a take on the fact that while many tourists are visiting the Las Vegas Strip, they are actually spending most of their time in the town of Paradise rather than in the actual city of Las Vegas.

This was the last film by Mandate Pictures before it was reorganized as Good Universe.

Plot

Lamb Mannerhelm goes to speak at her family's church in Montana one year after surviving a plane crash, which has left her with severe burns all over her body. While everyone is expecting her to make some big announcement, she instead publicly denounces her belief in God, causing a major uproar in the church. Lamb later explains some of the strict rules she has to live by in her conservative town, like listening only to Christian music, and not being allowed to wear pants. She was awarded money after the crash. Feeling both angry and inexperienced in life, Lamb heads to Las Vegas to indulge in the sinful pleasures that are objected in her community as she sees surviving the plane crash as a second chance at life and time for her to now live life on her own terms. Once there, she goes to a random bar in order to have her first drink, where she meets a bartender named William, and a singer named Loray. William is a British bartender living in Las Vegas while Loray is a part time film student who sings at the HiLo casino there. Lamb who had her first drink have adventures with Loray and meet sodomites in nightclubs as well as try ziplining. Lamb whose skin condition is worsening and bleeding is comforted by William and Loray but to all efforts she takes off in a cab. William and Loray soon find Lamb and is taken to her hotel by William. Lamb tries to seduce William but he refuses to make love due to her bleeding on her shoulder. Lamb does not want to return to Blakesley, Montana and wishes to stay in Vegas. William then explains there are plenty of fish in the sea and that the world is not just Blakesley, Montana or the Vegas Strip. She tries to understand. The next day, Lamb gives William money for Loray to return to school and tries a chocolate orgasm. She then heads to Blakesley and reconciles with her family. William still works at HiLo while Loray found an internship near her sister's place in Florida.

Cast
 Julianne Hough as Lamb Mannerhelm
 Russell Brand as William 
 Octavia Spencer as Loray
 Nick Offerman as Mr. Mannerhelm
 Holly Hunter as Mrs. Mannerhelm
 Iliza Shlesinger as Carol
 Kathleen Rose Perkins as Amber

Filming
The film was shot in New Orleans. Cast member Russell Brand was arrested during the shoot for grabbing a photographer's iPhone and throwing it through a window.

Reception

Critical response
On Rotten Tomatoes, the film holds an approval rating of 22% based on 41 reviews, with an average rating of 4.37/10. The website's critics consensus reads: "Paradise rounds up an impressive array of talent on either side of the camera -- all of whom would presumably prefer that audiences forget their involvement in this misfire." 
Metacritic gives the film a weighted average score of 35 out of 100, based on 15 critics, indicating ”generally unfavorable reviews".

References

External links
 
 

2013 films
American comedy-drama films
Films set in the Las Vegas Valley
2013 comedy-drama films
Films with screenplays by Diablo Cody
Films produced by Mason Novick
Films scored by Rachel Portman
Mandate Pictures films
Films directed by Diablo Cody
2013 directorial debut films
2010s English-language films
2010s American films